Fforest is a Welsh word and frequent place-name element meaning 'forest'.

 For the Carmarthenshire village, west of Pontarddulais, see Hendy
 For the hill north of Llandovery, Carmarthenshire, see Fforest (Carmarthenshire)